To be distinguished from :cs:Tomáš Král (born 1964) president of the Czech Ice Hockey Union

Tomáš Král  (born December 29, 1992) is a Czech professional ice hockey goaltender currently playing for HC Stadion Litoměřice in the Chance Liga.

Král began his career with HC Plzeň's under-18 team in 2007. After two years, he moved to Norway and signed for Lillehammer IK of the GET-ligaen in 2009 and debuted for Lillehammer's senior team during the 2010-11 season.

He then moved to Finland for the following season, with spells at HPK and Oulun Kärpät's junior team. He then spent the next two seasons playing in Finland's second-tier league Mestis and third-tier league Suomi-sarja before returning to the Czech Republic where he played one game for HC Sparta Praha during the 2013-14 season.

He later went on to play in eleven games for Piráti Chomutov and one game for HC Plzeň.

References

External links

1992 births
Living people
Czech ice hockey goaltenders
Hokki players
Iisalmen Peli-Karhut players
KOOVEE players
Lempäälän Kisa players
Lillehammer IK players
Piráti Chomutov players
HC Plzeň players
HC Slavia Praha players
HC Sparta Praha players
Sportovní Klub Kadaň players
Sportspeople from Plzeň
TuTo players
Competitors at the 2013 Winter Universiade
HC Stadion Litoměřice players
Czech expatriate ice hockey players in Finland
Czech expatriate sportspeople in Norway
Expatriate ice hockey players in Norway